Revolutionary Command Council may refer to:
Egyptian Revolutionary Command Council, body established to supervise Egypt after the 1952 Revolution
Revolutionary Command Council (Iraq), ultimate decision-making body in Iraq before the 2003 invasion
National Council for the Revolutionary Command, ultimate decision-making body in Syria in much of the 1960s
Libyan Revolutionary Command Council, twelve-people body that governed Libya after the 1969 Revolution
National Revolutionary Command Council (Sudan), ten-people body that governed Sudan after the 1969 coup d'état
Revolutionary Command Council for National Salvation, body that governed Sudan after the 1989 coup d'état
Syrian Revolutionary Command Council, an alliance of Syrian rebel groups

See also
RCC (disambiguation)
Revolutionary Council (disambiguation)